Valgelon-La Rochette is a commune in the southeastern French department of Savoie. It was established on 1 January 2019 by merger of the former communes of La Rochette (the seat) and Étable.

See also
Communes of the Savoie department

References

Communes of Savoie